Coordinates is the fourth extended play by Swedish pop boy band The Fooo Conspiracy. It was released in Sweden through The Artist House Stockholm on 7 January 2015. The album peaked at number 33 on the Swedish Albums Chart.

Singles
"Wild Hearts" was released as the lead single from the album on 19 January 2015.

Track listing

Charts

Weekly charts

Release history

References

2015 EPs
FO&O albums